Manchón Guamuchal is a litoral wetland zone situated along the Pacific coast of Guatemala. It is one of the last remaining mangrove forest area on the pacific coast of Guatemala and an important stop for migratory birds. It was declared a Ramsar site in 1995.

References

Ramsar sites in Guatemala
Protected areas established in 2005